Lt. Gen. V. K. Nayar PVSM, SM (died 30 November 2015) was a former Indian Army officer and Governor of Nagaland.

While in the Army, he served as a Paratrooper, an infantryman, a Counter-insurgency specialist and Army commander (GOC-in-C, Western Command).

Personal life
He was married to Sajni Nayar, had one son (also an Army Officer) and one daughter. He died on 30 November 2015.

Bibliography
 From Fatigues to Civvies: Memoirs of a Paratrooper (2013)

References

Governors of Nagaland
Date of birth missing